Changle may refer to:

Changle, city in Fujian, China
Changle County, in Shandong, China

Towns and townships
 Changle, Shaoyang (长乐乡), a township of Shaoyang County, Hunan province.
Changle, Miluo (长乐镇), a town in Miluo City, Hunan province.
Changle River, in Zhejiang, China
The edible fungi:
Clavulina cristata
Ramaria flava